Destiny is the seventh studio album by power metal band Stratovarius, released on 5 October 1998 through Noise Records. It reached No. 1 on the Finnish albums chart and remained on that chart for 17 weeks. "SOS" was released as a single, reaching No. 2 on the Finnish singles chart and remaining on that chart for eleven weeks.

In 2019, Metal Hammer ranked it as the 7th best power metal album of all time.

Track listing

Personnel
Timo Kotipelto – vocals
Timo Tolkki – guitar, engineering, production
Jens Johansson – keyboards
Jörg Michael – drums
Jari Kainulainen – bass guitar
Max Savikangas – strings
Eicca Toppinen – strings
Sanna Salmenkallio – strings
"Mr. Unknown" – strings
Cantores Minores – choir
Timo Ojala – conducting
Mikko Karmila – engineering, mixing
Mika Jussila – mastering
Pauli Saastamoinen – mastering

Chart performance

Album

Singles

References

External links
Destiny at stratovarius.com

See also
List of number-one albums (Finland)

Stratovarius albums
1998 albums
Noise Records albums